Mount Mitchell is a mountain in Clackamas County in the U.S. state of Oregon. It is located southwest of Mount Hood in the Roaring River Wilderness on the Mount Hood National Forest.

The mountain was name for Roy Mitchell, a veteran of World War I who died fighting a wild fire. Prior  to 1923 the mountain had been known as Oak Grove mountain although there were no Oak trees on the mountain.

References 

Cascade Range
Mountains of Oregon
Mountains of Clackamas County, Oregon